Ashish Mane (Born 14 August 1990) is one of the prominent professional mountaineer from India. He has scaled Mt. Everest (2012)., Mt. Lhotse (2013), Mt. Makalu (2014), Mt Manaslu (2017) and Kanchenjunga (2019). Ashish is the only climber from Maharashtra as of now, to ascend five of the fourteen Eight-thousander|peaks over 8,000 metres means about 26,000 ft above sea level. In the year 2016, he attempted to scale Daulagiri, but due to technical reasons he had to quit the expedition

Background 
Ashish hails from Satara, Maharashtra. He is an alumnus of Raje Shivraya Pratishthan college in Kothrud, Pune. He holds a master's degree in Computer Science. He did his basic mountaineering course from Nehru Institute of Mountaineering (NIM) at Uttarkashi. He has done multiple treks in Sahyadri ghats.

His fascination towards mountains and trekking in Konkan region, inspired him to climb in Himalayas.

Expeditions

Awards
Ashish has received following awards

 Shiv Chhatrapati State Sports award for year 2014-15

See also
Indian summiters of Mount Everest - Year wise
List of Mount Everest summiters by number of times to the summit
List of Mount Everest records of India
List of Mount Everest records

References

Further reading 
 Ashish Mane ( May, 2013) "After Everest, I wanted to scale technical peaks like Lhotse"
 Ashish Mane (Dec, 2017) "My greatest achievement was scaling Mt Makalu, being first Indian civilian to do so"

External links 
  CM Fadnavis praises Giripremi’s Everest climbers
  Pune Giripremi’s Travails: To the death zone and back, six successful times
  Ashish Mane summits Mount Manaslu
  Indian Mountaineer
  शिव छत्रपती राज्य साहसी क्रीडा पुरस्कार year 2014-15

Indian mountain climbers
1990 births
Living people
Indian summiters of Mount Everest
Indian male athletes